Battle of Andros may refer to one of the following battles fought on or near the Greek island of Andros:

 Battle of Andros (246 BC), between Ptolemaic Egypt and Antigonid Macedonia
 Battle of Andros (1696), between Venice and the Ottoman Empire
 Battle of Andros (1790), between the Greek privateer Lambros Katsonis and the Ottoman Empire
 Battle of Andros (1825), between the Greek revolutionary fleet and the Ottoman Empire